Kimpton  may refer to:

 Kimpton (surname)
 Kimpton, Hampshire, a village and civil parish in Hampshire, England
 Kimpton, Hertfordshire, a village in Hertfordshire, England
 Kimpton, Missouri, a ghost town
 Kimpton Hotels & Restaurants, an American hotel and restaurant company
 Kimpton Middle School, a school in Munroe Falls, Ohio, U.S.